Olya Ovtchinnikova  (born February 6, 1987) is a Canadian fencer.  Ovtchinnikova started fencing for recreation in Moscow, Russia, where she participated in local competitions.  In 2000, her family moved to Toronto, Ontario, Canada, where she began to train more seriously. She speaks both Russian and English.

She competed in the individual and team sabre events at the 2008 Summer Olympics, but did not win a medal. She was a member of the Canadian team that finished in seventh place.

References

External links 
  Profile on the 2008 Summer Olympics official site

1987 births
Living people
Russian female sabre fencers
Canadian female sabre fencers
Fencers at the 2008 Summer Olympics
Naturalized citizens of Canada
Olympic fencers of Canada
Martial artists from Moscow
Sportspeople from Toronto
Canadian people of Russian descent
Pan American Games bronze medalists for Canada
Pan American Games medalists in fencing
Fencers at the 2007 Pan American Games
Medalists at the 2007 Pan American Games